María Elena Álvarez Bernal (born 5 October 1930) is a Mexican politician from the National Action Party. She has  served as Deputy of the L, LVI, LVIII and LX Legislatures of the Mexican Congress and as Senator of the LVII Legislature representing Michoacán.

References

1930 births
Living people
People from Zamora, Michoacán
Politicians from Michoacán
Women members of the Senate of the Republic (Mexico)
Members of the Senate of the Republic (Mexico)
Members of the Chamber of Deputies (Mexico)
Presidents of the Chamber of Deputies (Mexico)
National Action Party (Mexico) politicians
21st-century Mexican politicians
21st-century Mexican women politicians
Women members of the Chamber of Deputies (Mexico)
20th-century Mexican politicians
20th-century Mexican women politicians
Mexican educators
National Autonomous University of Mexico alumni
Academic staff of the National Autonomous University of Mexico
Women legislative speakers